Elephants on Acid is the ninth studio album by American hip hop group Cypress Hill, and is the group's first studio album in eight years following Rise Up making it the group's longest gap between albums. The album was released on September 28, 2018. The album includes 21 tracks. Unlike Rise Up, the group's last album, which was produced by a number of people, this album is fully produced by DJ Muggs.

Despite serving as an interlude, "Muggs Is Dead" was released as a second single of the album on August 23 and received an animated video.

Reception
The Independent said about the album, "On their first album in eight years, Cypress Hill still sound like no one else."

AllMusic reviewer Fred Thomas said that "Thirty years into any music career, the pressure is generally off. Cypress Hill, active since 1988 and best known for their weed-friendly gangsta rap hits from the '90s, could easily rewrite and revisit the ideas that made them famous for the rest of their days and fans would delight in the familiarity."

The Guardian said of the album "Most episodes of the superb HBO sitcom Silicon Valley end with a musical outro: usually banging hip-hop. This album by Cypress Hill should make the music supervisors’ job on season six a doddle."

Track listing

Personnel
Cypress Hill
 Louis "B-Real" Freese – lead vocals
 Senen "Sen Dog" Reyes – co-lead vocals
 Lawrence "DJ Muggs" Muggerud – turntables, samples, producer
 Eric "Bobo" Correa – drums, percussion

Additional 
 Kory B. Garnett – vocals (tracks: 8, 16, 18, 21)
 Alaa Fifty – vocals (track 2)
 Sadat – vocals (track 2)
 Sumach Ecks – vocals (track 5)
 Joaquin "Sick Jacken" Gonzalez – vocals (track 10)
 Fredwreck – keyboards, guitars, mixing
 Terrace Martin – alto saxophone
 Adam Turchin – baritone and tenor saxophone
 Josef Leimberg – trumpet, valve trombone

Production 
 Dave Kutch – mastering
 Ramon Cho – artwork
 Felipe Romero – artwork
 Darren Vargas – artwork
 Deb Klein – management

Charts

Release history

References

Cypress Hill albums
2018 albums
BMG Rights Management albums
Albums produced by DJ Muggs